Matthew J. Cetlinski (born October 4, 1964) is an American former competition swimmer, Olympic gold medalist, and former world record-holder.

Cetlinski was born in Lake Worth, Florida.  He attended Cardinal Newman High School in West Palm Beach, Florida.  As a junior swimmer, he trained with the Wellington Wahoos Swim Club in nearby Wellington, Florida.

Cetlinski accepted an athletic scholarship to attend the University of Florida in Gainesville, Florida, where he swam for coach Randy Reese's Florida Gators swimming and diving team in National Collegiate Athletic Association (NCAA) and Southeastern Conference (SEC) competition from 1983 to 1986.  He was a member of the Gators' 1983 and 1984 NCAA men's championship teams, as well as four consecutive SEC championships teams.  As Gator swimmer, he won the NCAA championship in the 500-yard freestyle event in 1986 and received eight All-American honors over the course of his collegiate career.  Cetlinski graduated from Florida with a bachelor's degree in religion in 1987, and was inducted into the University of Florida Athletic Hall of Fame as a "Gator Great" in 1997.

Cetlinski won a gold medal at the 1988 Summer Olympics in Seoul, South Korea, where he was a member of the first-place U.S. team in the men's 4×200-meter freestyle relay, together with teammates Troy Dalbey, Doug Gjertsen and Matt Biondi who swam in the final, as well as Craig Oppel and Dan Jorgensen who swam in the qualifying heats of the event.  The Americans set a new world record of 7:12.51 in the event final.  Individually, Cetlinski also placed fourth in the men's 400-meter freestyle (3:48.09) and the men's 1,500-meter freestyle (15:06.42).

Cetlinski now works as an acupuncturist in Gainesville, Florida.

See also 
 List of Olympic medalists in swimming (men)
 List of University of Florida alumni
 List of University of Florida Athletic Hall of Fame members
 List of University of Florida Olympians
 World record progression 4 × 200 metres freestyle relay

References

External links 
 

1964 births
Living people
American male freestyle swimmers
Florida Gators men's swimmers
World record setters in swimming
Olympic gold medalists for the United States in swimming
Pan American Games silver medalists for the United States
People from Lake Worth Beach, Florida
Swimmers at the 1983 Pan American Games
Swimmers at the 1988 Summer Olympics
Place of birth missing (living people)
Medalists at the 1988 Summer Olympics
Pan American Games medalists in swimming
Medalists at the 1983 Pan American Games